Defensive computing is a form of practice for computer users to help reduce the risk of computing problems, by avoiding dangerous computing practices. The primary goal of this method of computing is to be able to anticipate and prepare for potentially problematic situations prior to their occurrence, despite any adverse conditions of a computer system or any mistakes made by other users. This can be achieved through adherence to a variety of general guidelines, as well as the practice of specific computing techniques.

Strategies for defensive computing could be divided into two categories, network security and the backup and restoration of data.

Network security 
Users put their computers at risk when accessing the Internet and other networks. The use of either of these allows others to gain access to a user's system and important information. By implementing certain strategies, defensive users aim to reduce the risk associated with network access.

Firewall 
A firewall is a collection of security measures that protects a computer from harmful inbound and outbound traffic on the Internet and prevents the unauthorized access of computer systems. These security measures are integrated into the form of special software that runs autonomously either on individual computer systems, or externally through built in software within routers and modems.

Not all firewall software will protect computers from sending unauthorized or harmful outbound traffic.
An important defensive computing strategy is to seek and implement quality firewall software that filters both inbound and outbound traffic.

Anti-malware software 
A basic strategy for all defensive computer users is to install and use anti-malware software.
Firewalls may not completely protect a computer. Malicious software may be able to get through a firewall and onto a system. Anti-Malware such as anti-virus, anti-phishing and email filtering software offer some protection against harmful software that reside within a computer. The amount of  malicious software available over the Internet is steadily increasing. It is important for defensive users to use to anti-malware that is both effective and easily updated in order to combat new strains of malicious software that are developed.

The other side of anti malware is that it contains serious vulnerabilities itself. A malware could use vulnerabilities of anti-malware to launch malicious code. 

Anti-malware works by scanning files a network connections for known signatures. Those signatures can never be up to date. To be able to scan network connections, encryptions (SSL/TLS) need to be bypassed or even broken by anti-malware software. When monitoring emails anti-malware opens all attachments for analysis, a bug in this scanner can be used as a starting point for malware. Attackers just need to send malware to a mailbox that is scanned automatically.

It is questionable if malware scanners are even useful at all. Ex Mozilla developer Rober O'Callahan writes in his blog that anti malware software should be disabled (except windows defender)

Skepticism 
	An important aspect of defensive computing is for users to be skeptical of the data to which they have access via the Internet. Malicious software can exist in a multitude of different forms and many are misleading to general computer users and even some anti-malware software. Defensive users think critically about the information they can access, to reduce their chances of downloading and spreading malicious software. Strategies include scanning email attachments prior to opening them and manually filtering suspicious emails from inboxes. Users should be aware of persuasive subject lines and headings in emails from any address, as they may actually contain malicious software or spam, which can mislead users into false advertisement resulting in identity theft.
Defensive users can scan files they download prior to opening them and can also configure their computers to show file extensions, revealing potentially dangerous files that appear harmless.
Skepticism can also be applied to the websites visited by users. As with emails, users can be led to false advertisements. Also, malicious software can unknowingly be downloaded and infect a computer, just by visiting a certain website.

Backup and recovery procedures 
Despite the efforts of a defensive computer user, the loss of important data can occur due to malware, power outages, equipment failure and general misuse. Although the loss of data cannot be completely prevented, defensive users can take steps to minimize the amount of data lost and restore systems to their previous state.

Backup of files 
	A defensive strategy against unintentional data loss is the regular backup of important files. Users can make multiple copies of important data and store them either on the same computer or on another device such as a compact disc or an external hard drive. Users can also upload important files to the Internet, provided they have access to Internet storage services.

Restoration 
Some operating systems give users the option of performing a procedure that restores a computer to a predetermined state. If no option is available, a user can obtain the appropriate restoration software for their system. In the event of a system failure or a serious case of data loss, a user can restore any lost or changed files and remove any malicious files that did not previously exist.

Good practices for protecting data 
 Regularly backup important files, documents and emails.
 Do not use the administrator account for day-to-day activities.
 Keep software up-to-date with the latest versions. 
 Keep antivirus and antispyware up-to-date with latest versions.
 Use different passwords 
 Disable auto run feature from USB flash drives. Some viruses, specially worms, spread automatically through USB flash drives 
 Always connect to the Internet behind a firewall
 When in doubt, throw it out

See also 
 Stopping e-mail abuse
 Phishing
 Computer insecurity
 End-user computing
 Network security
 Computer worm
 Computer security
 Defense strategy (computing)

References

External links
 Defensive computing priorities  by Michael Horowitz December 2009 

Computer security
Backup